Denov is a district of Surxondaryo Region in Uzbekistan. The capital lies at the city Denov.

The district consists of one city (Denov), 12 urban-type settlements (Doʻstlik, Yurchi, Qiziljar, Xolchayon, Xitoyan, Paxtakurash, Namozgoh, Jamatak, Yangi Hazorbogʻ, Yangibogʻ, Dahana, Yangiobod) and 17 rural communities (Anbarsoy, Denov, Kenagas, Qiziljar, Fargʻona, Tortuvli, Pistamozor, Sina, Xayrabot, Hazarbogʻ, Xolchayon, Yangibogʻ, Yangizamon, Yurchi, Yangiobod, Binokor, Dahana).

Education
There is one institutions of higher education:
Denau Institute of Entrepreneurship and Pedagogy

References 

Districts of Uzbekistan
Surxondaryo Region